A heteroreceptor is a receptor regulating the synthesis and/or the release of mediators other than its own ligand.

Heteroreceptors respond to neurotransmitters, neuromodulators, or neurohormones released from adjacent neurons or cells; they are opposite to autoreceptors, which are sensitive only to neurotransmitters or hormones released by the cell in whose wall they are embedded.

Examples
 Norepinephrine can influence the release of acetylcholine from parasympathetic neurons by acting on α2 adrenergic (α2A, α2B, and α2C) heteroreceptors.
 Acetylcholine can influence the release of norepinephrine from sympathetic neurons by acting on muscarinic-2 and muscarinic-4 heteroreceptors. 
 CB1 negatively modulates the release of GABA and glutamate, playing a crucial role in maintaining a homeostasis between excitatory and inhibitory transmission.
 Glutamate released from an excitatory neuron escapes from the synaptic cleft and preferentially affects mGluR III receptors on the presynaptic terminals of interneurons. Glutamate spillover leads to inhibition of GABA release, modulating GABAergic transmission.

See also
Autoreceptor

References

Receptors
Cell signaling